Groovin' with Golson is the sixth album by saxophonist Benny Golson featuring performances recorded in 1959 and originally released on the New Jazz label.

Reception

The Allmusic review by Scott Yanow states, "the hard bop music does indeed groove in its own fashion".

Track listing
All compositions by Benny Golson except where noted.
 "My Blues House" - 9:25     
 "Drum Boogie" (Roy Eldridge, Gene Krupa) - 3:59     
 "I Didn't Know What Time It Was" (Richard Rodgers, Lorenz Hart) - 5:25     
 "The Stroller" - 9:18     
 "Yesterdays" (Jerome Kern, Otto Harbach) - 5:54

Personnel
Benny Golson - tenor saxophone
Curtis Fuller - trombone  
Ray Bryant - piano
Paul Chambers - bass
Art Blakey - drums

References 

New Jazz Records albums
Benny Golson albums
1959 albums
Albums produced by Esmond Edwards
Albums recorded at Van Gelder Studio